Fried, Frank, Harris, Shriver & Jacobson LLP (known as Fried Frank), is an international law firm headquartered in New York City. The firm also has offices in Washington, D.C., London, Frankfurt, and Brussels, and has more than 500 attorneys worldwide. The firm is regarded as a modern white-shoe law firm and leads on many complex financial and litigious matters.

History 

Fried, Frank, Harris, Shriver & Jacobson traces its origins back to the turn of the twentieth century to the predecessor firms Riegelman & Bach, Riegelman Hess & Strasser and Strasser Spiegelberg Fried and Frank. These firms were founded by German Jewish attorneys. In 1971, the firm took its current form with name partners Walter Fried, Hans Frank, Sam Harris, Sargent Shriver and Leslie Jacobson.

Fried Frank has four offices. It opened a Washington, D.C. office in 1949. Fried Frank also opened a Los Angeles office in 1986, but closed it in 2005. In 1970, Fried Frank opened a London office. A Paris satellite office followed in 1993 and has since closed. It opened in Frankfurt in 2004. In December 2006, the firm opened its Hong Kong office, recruiting the greater China managing partner of Simmons & Simmons, Huen Wong and other key partners. The firm officially launched an office in Shanghai in October 2007. In January 2015, Fried Frank announced it was closing its offices in Hong Kong and Shanghai, effectively pulling the plug on its Asia practice.

In 2002, Fried Frank engaged in merger talks with Ashurst Morris Crisp, which did not result in a transaction. Fried Frank later hired Ashurst's former managing partner, Justin Spendlove.

As of its fiscal year ended February 2020, the firm saw gross revenue of $776 million, up from $684.8 million the year before. Revenue per lawyer rose 8.2 percent, to $1.442 million, while its profits per partner jumped 16 percent, to $3.79 million.

Clients
In 2005, Friend Frank represented Tishman Speyer in its $1.7 billion acquisition of the MetLife Building at 200 Park Avenue. At the time, the deal set a record for the highest sale price of an office building in the United States.

In September 2022, Fried Frank advised Goldman Sachs on the formation of its flagship corporate buyout fund, which closed with total commitments of $9.7 billion, making it Goldman's largest private equity fund since 2007.

In 2022, former FTX CTO Gary Wang hired Fried Frank to represent him in the federal probe into the cryptocurrency exchange FTX's collapse, in which Wang entered into a plea deal with the Office of the US Attorney for the Southern District of New York.

Notable alumni
Michael R. Bromwich
Douglas J. Feith
Martin D. Ginsburg
Jason Greenblatt
Elena Kagan
Max Kampelman
Arthur Lazarus Jr.
Robert Mundheim 
Harvey Pitt
Jed Rakoff
Patricia Roberts Harris
Richard Schifter
Sargent Shriver
Audrey Strauss
William Howard Taft IV
Marc Zell
Vanessa Ruiz

See also
List of largest law firms by profits per partner

References

External links
 Official website

Law firms based in New York City
Law firms with year of establishment missing
Law firms with offices in foreign countries